Araks Ararat FC, is a defunct Armenian football club from the town of Ararat, Ararat Province.

Club history
The club was founded in 1960 as FC Ararat to represent the town of Ararat. With the independence of Armenia, the Ararat Cement Factory took over FC Ararat in 1993 and the club was renamed FC Tsement Ararat. They played in the Armenian Premier League and won two titles, the first in 1998 as Tsement and the 2nd in 2000 as Araks Ararat. The following year, Tsement yielded the championship to FC Shirak by two points and ended up on the third spot behind FC Ararat Yerevan. However, after many successful years, the club president Abraham Babayan was unable to finance the club. Eventually, the rights were sold in late 2000 to a new sponsor based in Yerevan and Araks Ararat FC was dissolved.

The club was resurrected a year later for the 2002 season, but since it gave its license for participating in the Premier League to Spartak Yerevan, was unable to participate in Premier League and had to settle to restart from the First League.

Honours
Armenian Premier League
Winners (2): 1998, 2000
Armenian Cup
Winners (2): 1998, 1999
Armenian Super Cup
Winners (1): 1998

Domestic history

Araks Ararat in European competitions
As of June, 2010.

Notes:
 Home results are noted in Bold.

References

Association football clubs established in 1960
Araks Ararat
1960 establishments in Armenia
2005 disestablishments in Armenia